Jessore, officially Jashore, is a city of Jessore District situated in Khulna Division. It is situated in the south-western part of Bangladesh. It is the administrative centre (headquarter) of the eponymous district and the third largest and second developed city in Khulna Division. It is one of the industrious and developed cities in Bangladesh and it is also the second developed city of Khulna Division. Jessore city consists of 9 wards and 73 mahalls. Jashore municipality was established in 1864. The area of the town is 21.15  km2. It has a population of about 2,98,000 according to the record of Jessore municipality. Jessore also has a domestic airport named as Jessore Airport.The city is named after the famous Jeshoreshwari Kali Temple which is a holy Shaktipeeth.

History 
It was the capital of Pratapaditya, the one and only Hindu ruler of the 12 Bhuiyas of Bengal, who had also famously fought against Mughal intrusion in East Bengal. He was defeated by Mughal forces and his territories were annexed into the Mughal Empire.

It was the first district to be freed and taken back by Bengali rule in the Liberation War, on the 8th of December, 1971.

Education 
The Jessore city is the Educational and Cultural hub for Jessore District, as well as Khulna Division. There are: 1 university, 3 medical colleges and a few universities located here. They are:

 Jashore University of Science and Technology
 Jessore Medical College
 Army Medical College, Jessore
 Sakina Medical College & Hospital, Jashore
 Michael Madhusudan College  
 Jessore Zilla School
 Cantonment College, Jashore
 Jashore Govt. Shikkah Board Model School & College
 BAF Shaheen College, Jashore
 Jashore English School and College, Jashore

Transport

Notes

References

Jashore District
Populated places in Khulna Division
Pourashavas of Bangladesh